Wrocław University of Science and Technology ( is a technological university in Wrocław, Poland. With buildings and infrastructures dispersed throughout the city, its main facilities are gathered at a central location near Plac Grunwaldzki, alongside the Oder river. It operates three regional branches in Jelenia Góra, Legnica, and Wałbrzych. Huffington Post UK named Wrocław University of Science and Technology in the top 15 of the World’s Most Beautiful Universities Rankings.

Students and staff

Currently the university educates almost 26,000 students in over 50 Bachelor, Master, and PhD programs. Every year over 4,000 degrees are conferred with over 80,000 graduates since its foundation. The university staff consists of over 2000 academic employees and another 2,000 administration workers.

Rankings
In 2021, Wrocław University of Science and Technology was among the best universities in the world - according to The Academic Ranking of World Universities (ARWU), i.e. the Shanghai ranking. The university was classified in places 901-1000, at the same time taking third place among Polish technical universities. Three areas are included in the Global Ranking of Academic Subjects 2021 among the fields of science that are conducted at Wrocław University of Science and Technology. Mathematics was classified in places 201-300, and energy (Energy Science and Engineering) and Mechanical Engineering in places 301-400.

In the prestigious QS World University Rankings by Subject 2021, Wrocław University of Science and Technology has been classified in seven scientific fields: Material Sciences (places between 301-350), Engineering-Mechanical (places between 301-350), Engineering-Electrical and Electronic (places between 351 -400), Mathematics (places range 351-400), Chemistry (places range 401-450), Physics & Astronomy (places range 501-550, Computer Sciences and Information Systems (places range 501-550).

In the Regional Rankings Emerging Europe and Central Asia 2020 as part of the QS World University Rankings, in which universities in Eastern, Central and Central Asia are classified, Wrocław University of Science and Technology was ranked 43rd, and among national universities - 4th.

In the most important Polish ranking of universities, "Perspektywy", Wrocław University of Science and Technology took 3rd place among technical universities in 2021 and 6th place among all academic universities in Poland.

History

The Polish Wrocław University of Technology was founded 24 August 1945. A group of 27 professors, originating from the University and Technical University of Lwów, arrived in Wrocław and started the Polish academic society in the destroyed or severely damaged buildings of the Technische Hochschule Breslau. The first lecture was given by Kazimierz Idaszewski on 15 November 1945. Since then that day has been celebrated as Wrocław Science Day.

In 1951 the university was divided into two institutions. The first rector of the newly established Wrocław University of Technology was Dionizy Smoleński. From this moment, the polytechnic developed quickly and underwent numerous organisational changes.

Nowadays students of this university take part in several science programmes such as SSETI Program – developing communication systems and steering for a satellite launched 5 October 2005.

The university is one of the founder of the International University of Logistics and Transport in Wrocław, with the city of Wrocław and the French university École supérieure internationale de commerce in Metz.

Organization

Wrocław University of Science and Technology is managed by a rector and five vice-rectors: for research, education, students' affairs, general affairs and development. Rectors and vice-rectors, as well as deans and directors of the departments are elected by the staff for five-year terms and may be re-elected once. The highest governing body within the university is the Senate, which consists of 75 members: rector, 5 vice-rectors, 12 deans, 12 students and 45 eligible staff representatives.

Faculties

The university offers education in 13 faculties:

Faculty of Architecture (W1)
 Architecture and Urban Planning
 Spatial Planning

Faculty of Civil Engineering (W2)
 Civil Engineering

Faculty of Chemistry (W3)
 Biotechnology
Chemistry and Industrial Analytics
Chemical and Process Engineering
Materials Science and Engineering 
Chemical Technology

Faculty of Computer Science and Telecommunication (W4N) 
Cybersecurity
IT Automation Systems
Algorithmical Computer Science
Applied Computer Science
Applied Computer Science in English
Technical Computer Science
Systems Engineering
Teleinformatics
Telecommunication

Faculty of Electrical Engineering (W5)
 Industrial Automation
 Electrical Mechatronics
 Electromobility
 Electrical Engineering

Faculty of Geoengineering, Mining and Geology (W6)
 Mining and Geology
 Geodesy and Cartography
 Geographical Computer Science
 Geoographical Energy Technology
 Natural Resources Engineering

Faculty of Environmental Engineering (W7)
 Environmental Engineering
 Closed Cycle Economy and Climate Protection

Faculty of and Management (W8)
 Management
 Management Engineering
 Management in English

Faculty of Mechanical and Power Engineering (W9)
 Mechanical Engineering and Machine Building
 Energy Engineering
 Aerospace Engineering
 Renewable Energy Sources

Faculty of Mechanical Engineering (W10)
 Control Engineering and Robotics
 Mechanical Engineering
 Transport
 Production Engineering and Management
 Mechatronics
 Biomechanical Engineering
 Mechanics and Machine Building

Faculty of Fundamental Problems of Technology (W11)
 Technical Physics
 Biomedical Engineering
 Optics
 Quantum Engineering

Faculty of Electronics, Microsystems and Photonics (W12)
 Automation and Robotics
 Electronic and Computer Engineering
 Electronics
 Electronics and Telecommunication
 Intelligent Electronics
 Mechatronic Microsystems Engineering

Faculty of Pure and Applied Mathematics (W13)
 Mathematics
 Applied mathematics

Research 

12195 publications in journals on the ISI Master Journal List.

11345 publications in JCRI indexed journals.

5495 registered inventions, including utility models.

Scientific Journals
1. Optica Applicata 
2. Material Science
3. Systems Science

Rectors 
 Stanisław Kulczyński (1945–1951)
 Dionizy Smoleński (1951–1960)
 Zygmunt Szparkowski (1960–1969)
 Tadeusz Porębski (1969–1980)
 Bogusław Kędzia (1 XII 1980–31 VIII 1981)
 Tadeusz Zipser (1 IX–29 XII 1981)
 Jerzy Schroeder (6 I–31 VII 1982)
 Wacław Kasprzak (1982–1984)
 Jan Kmita (1984–1990)
 Andrzej Wiszniewski (1990–1996)
 Andrzej Mulak (1996–2002)
 Tadeusz Luty (2002–2008)
 Tadeusz Więckowski (2008–2016)
 Cezary Madryas (2016–2020)
 Arkadiusz Wójs (2020–)

Student life
Students have their own self-government, which controls most of their affairs. At the university works also the Career Office which helps students in transition process from education to work.

Student organizations
Active organizations
ASI – University Computer Science Association
AZS – University Sport Association
AIESEC – International Association of the Economy and Commerce Students'
ESN – Erasmus Student Network
IAESTE – The International Association for the Exchange of Students for the Technical Experience
IACES – International Association of Civil Engineering Students
NZS – Independent Students' Union
AKM Apanonar – Academic Motors Club

European cooperation networks

 Neisse University: 2001, in cooperation with the Technical University of Liberec in Czech Republic and the University of Applied Sciences Zittau/Goerlitz in Germany, the Neisse University was established. The academic network provides own study courses using the resources of the partner institutes. In that way students study in three countries and acquire intercultural and interdisciplinary knowledge and experiences.
 Top Industrial Managers for Europe: The university participate to student mobility and research cooperations with European technology universities through the Top Industrial Managers for Europe (TIME) network.

International cooperation
 Power Engineering Graduate Program – Double master's degree with Ryerson University
 Joint Master-Program "Information Technology] with Ostwestfalen-Lippe University of Applied Sciences, Halmstad University and Aalborg University.

Centres
 Wroclaw Centre for Networking and Supercomputing: Networking and Supercomputing services for local universities
 Wroclaw Centre for Technology Transfer: to increase the efficiency and the competitiveness of industry through innovation
 Lower Silesia Centre for Advanced Technology: promotion of clean technologies, hydrogen and fuel cells, food safety
 Centre of Advanced Materials and Nanotechnology : GaN devices, delta-doped structures, scanning probe microscopy, polymers
 Centre of Biomedical Engineering
 Hugo Steinhaus Center :   to organize, encourage and support research on and education in stochastic techniques as applied in science and technology
 Centre of Advanced Manufacturing Technology (CAMT)
 Center of Biomonitoring, Biotechnology and Ecosystems Protection in Lower Silesia

Conferences
 The 7th European Meeting coinciding with the 1st World Meeting in Visual and Physiological Optics, VPOptics 2014
 Modern Electric Power Systems MEPS
 International Conference "Experimental Vibration Analysis for Civil Engineering Structures" – EVACES
 Energy Efficiency and Air Pollutants Control Conference

Notable faculty and alumni
Krzysztof Baranowski – yachtsman, sailor
Leszek Czarnecki – businessman, billionaire and world record holder in diving
Rafał Dutkiewicz – former president of the City of Wrocław
Jadwiga Grabowska-Hawrylak – architect
Wojciech Kurtyka – climber
Jan Paweł Nowacki – electrical engineer
Wanda Rutkiewicz – mountaineer
Hugo Steinhaus – mathematician
Władysław Ślebodziński – mathematician
Czesław Ryll-Nardzewski – mathematician
Włodzimierz Trzebiatowski – physicist, chemist and mathematician
Stanisław Tołpa – botanist
Stanisław Trybuła – mathematician
Krzysztof Wielicki – mountaineer, the fifth man to climb all fourteen eight-thousanders
Maja Włoszczowska – World Champion in mountain biking

See also
 University of Wrocław

References

External links
 Wrocław University of Science and Technology home page (polish version)
  SSETI Programme at the Wroclaw University of Technology

 
University
Art Nouveau educational buildings
Buildings and structures completed in 1911
1945 establishments in Poland
Educational institutions established in 1945